John O'Meara may refer to:
 John Corbett O'Meara (born 1933), United States federal judge
 John O'Meara (politician)  (1856–1904), Liberal Party Member of Parliament in New Zealand
 John J. O'Meara (1915–2003), Irish classical scholar and historian of ancient and medieval philosophy